HD 131473 is a binary star system in the northern constellation of Boötes. The primary is an F-type subgiant with a stellar classification of F4IV, while its companion is a G-type subgiant with a stellar classification of G1IV.

References

External links
 HR 5550
 Image HD 131473
 CCDM J14534+154

Boötes
131473
Binary stars
072846
F-type main-sequence stars
5550
Durchmusterung objects